Child Rights and You (CRY) is an Indian non-governmental organization (NGO) that works towards ensuring children's rights.

The organization was started in 1979 by Rippan Kapur, an Air India purser.  CRY works with 99 grassroot projects across 19 states in India and has impacted the lives of over three million children.

CRY addresses children's critical needs by working with parents, teachers, Anganwadi (Indian rural child care center) workers, communities, district and state-level governments, as well as the children, themselves. The organization focuses on changing behaviors and practices at the grassroots level and influencing public policy at a systemic level, to create an environment where children are the priority.

CRY works on 4 key areas:
Education (Right To Development)
Health & Nutrition (Right To Survival)
Safety & Protection (Right To Protection)
Child Participation (Right To Participation)

History

Established in 1979 as Child Relief and You, CRY was started by Rippan Kapur who wanted to ensure happier childhoods for India's children. Rippan chose to build CRY as an institution that inspired citizens to contribute towards this cause and also empowered local NGOs with funding and technical know-how to create a lasting impact. Kapur died in 1994.

CRY has developed from originally an organisation providing welfare relief for children to an organisation advocating for children's rights. It has worked to ensure that the diversity in ethnicity, religion, and caste among its staff is a strength and does not prevent success in its mission.

CRY participated in the 'Voice Of India' campaign as a part of the National Alliance for the Fundamental Right to Education (NAFRE), to propose a constitutional amendment for free and compulsory education to all children.  This contributed to the Right of Children to Free and Compulsory Education Act, 2009 (RTE).

CRY is involved with several international forums on children's rights, including Girls Not Brides and the National Action and Coordination Group For Ending Violence Against Children (NACG-EVAC). NACG-EVAC is a national platform under the aegis of the South Asia Initiative to End Violence Against Children (SAIEVAC), which is an intergovernmental platform working in eight countries.

The organisation is active on social media.

Impact
 
In 2019–20, CRY has affected more than 6.8 lakh (680,000) underprivileged children in India.
1,63,541 children in CRY project areas, between the ages of 6–18 years, in school
97% of children in CRY project areas, under the age of 1 year, immunised
88% of children in CRY project areas, under the age of 5 years, free from malnutrition
2,064 children in CRY project areas rescued from child labour, child marriage and child trafficking

Campaigns

CRY has launched the following campaigns:

 #YellowFellow, which raises awareness for the right to a happy childhood. Launched in 2018, the campaign encourages people to show support for India's children by posting photos while wearing yellow socks in a creative way. The campaign has reached 1.7 crore (17 million) people across India.
 #LearnNotEarn, which was held on World Day Against Child Labour (12 June) in 2018 and 2019, helped raise awareness on the issue of child labour in India, and encouraged citizens to ensure that children are able to go to school instead of work. Child labour is an important area of focus for the charity.
 #ItsAGirlThing, which was released on National Girl Child Day (24 January) 2019 and aimed to break the stereotypes associated with girls.
 #NotYet, which was held on International Women's Day (8 March) 2020 and raised awareness of child marriage issues.
 #PooriPadhaiDeshKiBhalai, which was held in April 2001, was a national campaign to raise awareness on the economic and social importance of girls completing their secondary education.
 #Body Shop India Partners With CRY, a 2021 campaign sponsored by the beauty products brand to raise awareness of menstruation, menstruation shaming, and its impact on girls and women, along with menstrual health and education efforts.

CRY has also campaigned for increased government investment in child protection and education. It has highlighted child malnutrition and access to health care. In 2021 the organisation drew attention to children's mental health and to the trauma children have experienced during the COVID-19 pandemic in India.

Awards and recognition

CRY has received the following awards and recognitions:
Most Trusted NGO (2018)
One Of The Top 100 Nonprofits In The World (2018)
Awarded to Puja Marwaha, CEO – CRY, For Social Innovation (2018)
Best Multi Channel Campaign For A Cause (#YellowFellow 2018)
ICAI CSR Award for Best CSR Project In Health & Education (2014)
CFBP Jamnalal Bajaj Award For Fair Business Practices (2014)
Quality Initiative Mission Award (2013)
Citi Woman Leader Awarded To Puja Marwaha, CEO – CRY (2012)
Fundraising Campaign Award (2011 & 2012)
Lakshya Award (2009 & 2012)
Indira Super Achiever Award (2003)
Marketing Excellence Award For Social Awareness (2001)
Viewers Choice Most Effective Ad Of the Year (1996)
Citizen Of Bombay Award For Rippan Kapur (1991)
C

Publications

CRY has commissioned four books about direct work with children. In July 2020, CRY launched the handbook Bal Sanrakshan Samiti in Mumbai to address severe issues of child protection in rural and urban areas. This handbook is step-by-step guide on how child protection committees should function at the village and ward level.

See also
 Odisha State Child Protection Society
 Gopali Youth Welfare Society

References

External links
 

Organizations established in 1979
1979 establishments in Maharashtra
Human rights organisations based in India
Children's rights organizations
Organisations based in Delhi
Children's charities based in India